Hisham ibn al-Hakam or Abul Hakam Hisham ibn Hakam Kendi was an 8th century AD (2nd century AH) Shiite scholar and a companion of Jafar al-Sadiq and Musa al-Kadhim. It was Hisham who defended the doctrine of Imamate. His debates on different religious matters are alive till present days.

Biography
The exact year of the birth of Hisham is not clear, but it is understood from several sources that he was born from Hakam in Kufa, the centre of Iraqi's Shiites, in the beginning of the second century AH, and grew up in Waset. Afterwards he lived a few years in Baghdad where he was conducting business. He was interested in Islamic theology and in his youth he was a follower of Jahm bin Safwan, leader of the Jahmi Sect. Afterwards during some debates with Jafar al-Sadiq, he became one of his followers. Of his first visit to the seventh Shiite imam, he himself says that one day while selling fabric under a shaded tree, Musa al-Kadhim happened to ride by. "He turned his face to me and said, 'O Hisham, selling something in the shadows is similar to cheating, and cheating is unlawful in Islam.'"

Debates
It is said that Hisham was skillful in debates, and that he said: "By God, till this day when I am standing here, nobody has defeated me in religious discourses." 
Jafar al-Sadiq used to praise him for his debates, in spite of the fact that the imam would advise his other companions not to engage in discussion, saying "Don't enter into a discussion, especially one about which you have no knowledge."

When a learned Syrian came to al-Sadiq to exchange views on various issues with him, the Imam made him discuss them with some of his disciples instead. Among these disciples were Hamran ibn A'yan, Aban ibn Taghlab, Zarareh, Taiyar, Hisham ibn Salem, and Hisham ibn Hakam. Then to show that not every kind of discussion is eligible he said "O Syrian brother, Hamran ibn A'yan came out victorious over you by distorting the facts and using clever speech and set forth his questions to you in a suitable and proper time; and you could not reply to him. Aban ibn Taghlab confused right and wrong to oust you from the combat of the debate and asked you questions to which you could not give the proper answers. But Zarareh defeated you with the help of analogy and allegory. Taiyar, another companion is just like that bird which sits sometimes and then rises up and
you are just like that wingless bird which has no power to rise up after sitting down once. Hisham ibn Salem used to put questions again and again cleverly. But Hisham ibn Hakam entered the arena with reasoning and diction and argued with you by means of logical reasoning."

On Imamate
Hisham wrote many books concerning the subject of the Imamate, and scholars of his time regarded him as the defender of the doctrine of "Imamate" and the "eye of the shiite" as he was a watchful protector of those who apposed imamat.

It is said that once a Syrian came to the Imam and he made some of his disciples to discuss with him in turn. Finally, the Imam turned his face to the Syrian and said: "If you like, you could also discuss with this young man - Hisham." The man addressed Hisham rudely and said, "O boy! If you have anything to say about the Imamate of your Imam, tell me?" Hisham, while shivering from anger said, "O sir, has your Lord created the human beings in vain and left them without any leader and guide?" The Syrian replied: "the Kind Creator is generous towards His servants and is not neglectful of them." Hisham said, "If it is just as you say, then describe the conditions of their leadership and guidance." The Syrian replied, "God has appointed His Hujjat (Guide) for the human beings, so that they might not dispute among themselves and not separate from each other. Rather they must love each other and come to friendly terms between themselves. The guide must explain the commandments of the Creator for them."

Hisham asked: "Who is that guide and leader?" The Syrian replied: "The Prophet of God." Hisham said: "When the Prophet left this world, who became responsible for the guidance of these people?" The Syrian replied: "The Quran and the traditions of the Prophet." Hisham said: "Today, it is a very long time since the death of the Prophet. Do you think the Book and the traditions alone can solve the disputes?" He replied: "Yes, of course, they are enough and sufficient." Hisham said: "If it is just as you say, then why do you and I dispute and why have you travelled such a long way from Syria?..."

With the chief of the Kharajites
The chief of the Kharijites was a learned man. Before starting with the debate Hisham said to his opponent that he was ready for the debate but they should appoint a referee among themselves so that if the discussion "be lengthy and reach a place where there may occur some problems and complications and both of us may not accept the reality due to obstinacy… so he may be able to make us return at the time of our deviation from the right path." When the Khregite agreed Hisham asked "who should be this referee and a follower of which religion? Should he be one of my supporters or one of your friends? Or one who oppose both of our beliefs or be opposed to the Muslim community and Islam?"

The Karegit said "You should select anyone whom you like, because you are a just man and I am satisfied with your selection."
"In my opinion," said Hisham, "it is a difficult task because if that judge comes from among my supporters then you will not be safe from his party spirit; and if he comes from among your supporters then I may not be safe. On the contrary, if he is from among the opponents and against both of our beliefs, then none of us may be safe from the harm of his unjustified arbitration. Then it is advisable that one man from each side oversees our speech; and witnesses our discussion and debate and arbitrates according to justice and fairness," recommended Hisham.

When the Kharegit agreed Hisham turned his face towards Yahya who held this discussion and said: "O Vizier (minister), be a witness that I have disapproved of his reasoning and have condemned him and have made him helpless. He has nothing to say anymore and I also do not need to debate with him." And when they asked him how he condemned the man while the discussion had not started yet, he said "Is it not true that in the beginning these Kharajites, were of the same opinion as we were concerning the matter of Imamate and the Wilayah of Ali until the problem of the arbitration occurred in the Battle of Siffin? They acted rudely… and called him (Ali) an infidel because of the acceptance of the arbitration although they themselves compelled him to accept this matter. Now this learned man who is himself respectable and reliable among his followers, has accepted the arbitration and judgement of the two men without any compulsion and force - one of these two men is my follower who is an infidel according to his Khawarijite belief and the other is his own supporter. Both of them have different beliefs and are opposed to each other. Now if he is right in choosing the arbitration and has chosen the right path, then there is no cause for him to criticize Amirul Mu'mineen who is more worthy and wise..."

Books
Hisham wrote many books on Islamic issues. Mohsen Amili, refuting Jalaluddin Seuti who had said that the first writer of fundamental of Muslim laws was Shafi'i, mentions the names of some scholars to prove that Hisham is the first man who wrote books on the fundamentals of speculative theology. Hisham was also skilled in argumentation about the Creator, unity of God, attributes of His Glory, discussion on free will, and natural philosophy. In spite of these, however, he has not always been a favorable character. Some scholars blamed him for dualism and infidelity and writes that he believed in corporeality of God. Responding the accusation, 'Alamul Huda, a Shiite scholar writes: "this famous sentence 'God is corporeal but not like other corporal bodies' which Hisham has been accused of saying, has been interpreted in different ways." Hisham was, he says, debating with Muʿtazila and he had to use their own phraseology.
 
Al-Shahrastani, the writer of the book Al-Milal wa al-Nihal said a similar thing when he wrote
that Hisham used this phrase during his debates with the group of Ghulat (extremists).

Some of his works:
 Kitab al-Imama (Book on the Imamate) 
 Kitab al-Dalalat ala Huduth al-Ashya (Book on the Signs for the Creation of Things) 
 Kitab al-Radd ala al-Zanadiqa (Book on the Answers to the Unbelievers) 
 Kitab Ashab al-Ithnayn (Book on the Companions of the Two Persons) 
 Kitab al-Tawhid (Book on the Oneness of Allah) 
 Kitab al-Radd ala Hisham al-Jawaliqi (Book on the Answers to Hisham al-Jawaliqi) 
 Kitab al-Radd ala Ashab al-Tabaiya (Book on the Answers to those Who Believe in Natures) 
 Kitab al-Shaykh wa al-Ghulam (Book on the Old Man and the Boy) 
 Kitab al-Tadbeer (Book on Management) 
 Kitab al-Maydan (Book on the Field)
 Kitab al-Mizan (Book on the Balance) 
 Kitab al-Radd ala men qala fi Imamat al-Mafdul (Book on the Answers to Those Who Believe in the Imamate of the Less Excellent) 
 Kitab Ikhtilaf al-Nas fi Imamat al-Mafdul (Book on that the People are Different over the Imamate of al-Mafdul)
 Kitab al-Wasiya wa al-Radd ala men ankereha (Book on the Testament and the Answers to Those Who Deny It) 
 Kitab al-Jabur wa al-Qadar (Book on Compulsion and Fate). 
 Kitab al-Hakamayn (Book on the Two Arbitrators) 
 Kitab al-Radd'ala al-Muʿtazila fi Telha wa al-Zubayr (Book on the Answers to the Muʿtazilites Concerning Telha and al-Zubayr) 
 Kitab al-Qeder (Book on Fate) 
 Kitab al-Alfad (Book on the Words) 
 Kitab al-Ma„rifa (Book on Knowledge) 
 Kitab al-Istita'a (Book on Capability) 
 Kitab al-Themaniyat Abbwab (Book on Eight Chapters) 
 Kitab al-Radd ala Shaytan al-Taq (Book on the Answers to Shaytan al-Taq) 
 Kitab al-Akhbar kayfa tufteh (Book on How the Traditions Are Opened) 
 Kitab al-Radd ala Aristotle fi al-Tawhid (Book on the Answers to Aristotle in Monotheism) 
 Kitab al-Radd ala al-Muʿtazila (Book on the Answers to the Muʿtazilites)
 Kitab al-Majalis fi al-Imama (Book on the Gatherings concerning the Imamate) 
 Kitab Ilal al-Tehreem (Book on the Causes of Prohibition) 
 Kitab al-Radd ala al-Qederiya (Book on the Answers to the Fatalists) Imam Musa read it, and praised him saying: "He has left nothing!" 
 Kitab al-Fara'id (Book on the Religious Duties).

Notes

References

Shia Islam
People from Kufa